Mike Morgan is an American sportscaster, who calls college football, basketball, and baseball games for ESPN and the SEC Network. Previously, he called Big 12 college football games for Fox Sports. He was formerly the voice of the South Carolina Gamecocks football, basketball, and baseball teams during which time he was named "South Carolina Sportscaster of the Year" five times. Other baseball duties include Atlanta Braves on radio and spring training games on television, Gwinnett Braves, and college baseball on Comcast/Charter Southeast. Morgan called NFL for the Carolina Panthers preseason games on television for 6 years from 2009-2014.

Baseball duties
He calls college baseball games for ESPN/SEC Network and is the television voice of the Gwinnett Braves. He called games for the Columbus Red Stixx for two seasons, and called Atlanta Braves spring training on CSS and South Carolina Gamecocks baseball on the radio. He has also been a fill in radio voice for the Atlanta Braves for select regular season games.

Basketball duties
He calls college basketball for ESPN/SEC Network and was the voice of the South Carolina Gamecocks men's basketball.

Football duties
He calls college football for ESPN/SEC Network and was the television voice of the South Carolina Gamecocks football and was the preseason voice of the Carolina Panthers. Morgan also has been calling several college football games on national radio for such outfits as SportsUSA including the Outback Bowl, Vegas Bowl, and Peach Bowl.

Personal life
He currently resides in Atlanta, Georgia.

References
https://web.archive.org/web/20120704062509/http://visionsportsllc.com/client_details.php?id=54
http://southcarolina.247sports.com/Article/Mike-Morgan-ESPN-South-Carolina-Gamecocks-basketball-43531848
http://www.thestate.com/sports/college/university-of-south-carolina/other-usc-sports/article53640320.html
http://www.talkingchop.com/2010/3/4/1356206/braves-add-a-new-broadcaster-for
Notes

Living people
American sports announcers
Baseball announcers
Women's college basketball announcers in the United States
College basketball announcers in the United States
College football announcers
National Football League announcers
Carolina Panthers announcers
People from Atlanta
South Carolina Gamecocks
South Carolina Gamecocks baseball announcers
Major League Baseball broadcasters
Year of birth missing (living people)
Minor League Baseball broadcasters